Lackan is a civil parish in County Westmeath, Ireland. This name also applies to the townland of Lackan.

Lackan is one of 8 civil parishes in the barony of Corkaree in the Province of Leinster.

Lackan civil parish comprises 10 townlands: Ballyharney, Carrick, Fulmort, Grange, Heathland, Knockmorris, Lackan, Lackanwood, Leny and Rathaniska.

The neighbouring civil parishes are: Street (barony of Moygoish) to the north, Multyfarnham to the east, Leny to the south and Russagh (Moygoish) to the west.

References

External links
Lackan civil parish at the IreAtlas Townland Data Base
Lackan civil parish at Townlands.ie
Lackan civil parish at Logainm.ie

Civil parishes of County Westmeath